Gordon Morrison may refer to:

 Gordon Morrison (engineer) (1903–1983) a New Zealand consulting engineer and local-body politician
 Gordon Morrison (alpine skier) (1931–1972), Canadian alpine skier
 Gordon Morrison (Shortland Street), a fictional character in the television soap opera Shortland Street